Zyryanka is the name of several places in Russia.

Urban localities
Zyryanka, an urban-type settlement in the Verkhnekolymsky District of the Sakha Republic

Rural localities
Zyryanka, Kemerovo Oblast, a village in Akatsiyevskaya Rural Territory of Tyazhinsky District of Kemerovo Oblast
Zyryanka, Krasnoyarsk Krai, a village in Kurbatovsky Selsoviet of Kazachinsky District of Krasnoyarsk Krai
Zyryanka, Kataysky District, Kurgan Oblast, a selo in Zyryansky Selsoviet of Kataysky District of Kurgan Oblast
Zyryanka, Yurgamyshsky District, Kurgan Oblast, a settlement in Chineyevsky Selsoviet of Yurgamyshsky District of Kurgan Oblast
Zyryanka, Novosibirsk Oblast, a settlement in Chulymsky District of Novosibirsk Oblast
Zyryanka, Ishimsky District, Tyumen Oblast, a village in Strekhninsky Rural Okrug of Ishimsky District of Tyumen Oblast
Zyryanka, Tyumensky District, Tyumen Oblast, a village in Uspensky Rural Okrug of Tyumensky District of Tyumen Oblast

Rivers
Zyryanka (river), a tributary of the Kolyma in Sakha